Massimo Marino (born 4 June 1954) is an Italian former cyclist. He competed at the 1972 and 1976 Summer Olympics.

References

1954 births
Living people
Italian male cyclists
Olympic cyclists of Italy
Cyclists at the 1972 Summer Olympics
Cyclists at the 1976 Summer Olympics
Cyclists from Rome
20th-century Italian people